Ernest John "Pug" Rentner (September 18, 1910 – August 24, 1978) was an American football halfback and quarterback who played professionally in the National Football League (NFL) for the Boston Redskins and the Chicago Bears.  He was inducted into the College Football Hall of Fame in 1979.

High school career
Rentner attended the Farragut School in Joliet, Illinois.

College career
Rentner played college football at Northwestern University and was chosen to the 1931 College Football All-America Team.  He was selected as Northwestern's Most Valuable Player in 1932.

References

1910 births
1978 deaths
American football halfbacks
American football quarterbacks
Boston Redskins players
Chicago Bears players
Northwestern Wildcats football players
All-American college football players
College Football Hall of Fame inductees
Sportspeople from Joliet, Illinois
Players of American football from Illinois